Charity may refer to:

Giving
 Charitable organization or charity, a non-profit organization whose primary objectives are philanthropy and social well-being of persons
 Charity (practice), the practice of being benevolent, giving and sharing
 Charity (Christian virtue), the Christian religious concept of unlimited love and kindness
 Principle of charity, in philosophy and rhetoric

Places
 Charity, Missouri, a community in the United States
 Charity, Guyana, a small township
 Mount Charity, Antarctica
 Charity Glacier, Livingston Island, Antarctica
 Charity Lake, British Columbia, Canada
 Charity Island (Michigan), United States
 Charity Island (Tasmania), Australia
 Little Charity Island, Lake Huron, Michigan
 Charity Creek, Sydney, Australia

Entertainment
 Charity (play), an 1874 play by W. S. Gilbert
 Charity (novel), third in the Faith, Hope, Charity espionage trilogy of novels by Len Deighton
 "Charity" (Dilbert episode)
 "Charity" (Malcolm in the Middle Episode)

Music
 "Charity", in the List of songs written by Cole Porter
 "Charity" (Courtney Barnett song)
 "Charity" (song), a 1995 single by Skunk Anansie

Paintings
 Charity (Piero del Pollaiolo)
 Charity (Reni, Florence)
 Charity (Reni, New York)

Sports
 Charity (horse) (1830–?), winner of the 1841 Grand National
 Charity Golf Classic, a tournament on the LPGA Tour from 1973 to 1975
 Charity Cup, an annual association football competition in New Zealand
 Charity Cup, an Australian soccer competition held between 1903 and 1961 - see Football West State Cup
 Charity Bowl, a one-time postseason college football bowl game, played in 1937

People
 Charity (name), an English feminine given name (including a list of people with the name)
 Amy Charity (born 1976), American racing cyclist
 Nicole Matthews (born 1987), professional wrestler under the ring name Charity

Other uses
 HMS Charity, several British Royal Navy ships
 MV Charity, a Cypriot cargo ship briefly in service during September 1972
 Charity Hospital (disambiguation)

See also

 Faith, Hope and Charity (disambiguation)